Alejandro Antonio Prieto  (born June 19, 1976) is a former Venezuelan middle infielder and third baseman in Major League Baseball who played for the Minnesota Twins in part of two seasons spanning 2003–2004. Listed at 5' 10" , 200 lb. , Prieto batted and threw right-handed. He was born in Caracas.

Career
Prieto was originally signed by the Kansas City Royals as an amateur free agent in 1992 and played in their Minor League system through 2002, when he joined the Twins organization until 2004. After that, he spent six seasons in the minors with several teams, including stints with the  Royals, Phillies and Red Sox organizations, retiring in 2010.

Better known for his defensive abilities than for his bat, Prieto hit an average of .209 with one home run and four RBI in 24 games for the Orioles. His most productive season in the minors came in 2001, when he posted a .282/.344/.418 slash line with eight homers and  44 RBI for Triple–A Omaha Golden Spikes.

In between, Prieto played winter ball in the Venezuelan Professional Baseball League during 14 seasons between 1993 and 2009, collecting a .261 average with eight homers and 117 RBI in 482 game appearances.

Following his playing days, Prieto began his coaching career as an infield instructor and evaluator.

See also
 List of Major League Baseball players from Venezuela

Sources
, or Retrosheet, or Pura Pelota (VPBL stats)

1976 births
Living people
Águilas del Zulia players
Bridgeport Bluefish players
Caribes de Anzoátegui players
Chico Outlaws players
Edmonton Capitals players
Edmonton Trappers players
Gulf Coast Royals players
Leones del Caracas players
Long Island Ducks players
Major League Baseball infielders
Major League Baseball second basemen
Major League Baseball players from Venezuela
Minnesota Twins players
Omaha Golden Spikes players
Omaha Royals players
Pawtucket Red Sox players
Reading Phillies players
Rochester Red Wings players
Baseball players from Caracas
Tiburones de La Guaira players
Venezuelan expatriate baseball players in Canada
Venezuelan expatriate baseball players in the United States
Wichita Wranglers players
Wilmington Blue Rocks players
Yuma Scorpions players